Turochak (Turaçak) is a rural locality (a selo) and the administrative center of Turochaksky District of the Altai Republic, Russia. Population:

Climate
Turochak has a humid continental climate (Köppen climate classification Dfb), typified by extreme variation in seasonal temperatures, with warm, humid summers and severely cold winters.

References

Notes

Sources

Rural localities in Turochaksky District